Grabsteinland II Herrschaft der Vampire is the ninth album of Untoten.

Track listing
"Unvergessen"– 5:41
"Raben"– 4:13
"Lichtbringer"– 4:57
"Dein Platz"– 5:14
"Der kleine Tod"– 3:56
"Die Rückkehr der Wölfe"– 3:45
"Reprise"– 0:39
"Düstergruften"– 3:23
"Als ich unter den Wölfen schlief"– 5:41
"Sturmvolk"– 1:17
"Ach Du kalter Stern im Norden"-3:13
"Jagdzauber (Traum)"-3:24
"Hexenwald"-2:23

Info
 All tracks written and produced by David A. Line
 Male vocals by David A. Line
 Female vocals by Greta Csatlós
 Album artwork by Greta Csatlós

External links
 Untoten Discography Info

2004 albums
Untoten albums